Katarzyna Janina Łaniewska-Błaszczak (20 June 1933 – 7 December 2020) was a Polish theatre and film actress,  opposition activist in the Polish People's Republic, and a political activist since 1989.

Biography 
Both of Katarzyna Łaniewska's parents came from Łódź. Her father was an activist of the co-operative movement and a Polish legionnaire during World War I, who was considered a "dangerous element" by the Nazis and murdered at Auschwitz after he was denounced by a colleague of Belarusian origin. Along with her mother and siblings, she survived the Warsaw Uprising, and was sent to the transit camp in Pruszków. Łaniewska and her family returned to Warsaw on 17 January 1945.

After the war, she joined the "harcerstwo" (polish version of Scouting). In 1955, she graduated from the Theatre Academy in Warsaw, and made her debut in the same year. She was president of the Warsaw branch of the Association of Polish Stage Artists (ZASP) and from 1992 to 2006 served on the Skolimowska Commission of ZASP Board.

By September 2013, she was a columnist of the weekly "W Sieci".

Political activities 
During her studies, she belonged to the socialist Union of Polish Youth, but as she said, "it is not true, as some are trying to insinuate that I managed the ZMP. It was not like [that].". She then belonged to the Polish United Workers' Party.

By the end of the seventies, she became involved with the anti-communist opposition. In 1980, she co-founded a branch of Solidarity at the Ateneum Theatre. She participated in organizing patriotic concerts and the distribution of underground publications. She worked with Jerzy Popiełuszko during this period.

In the Polish parliamentary elections in 2011, Łaniewska was a nonpartisan candidate to the Senate on behalf of the Law and Justice party in Warsaw. She received nearly 100 thousand votes (nearly 31%) and lost to the Civic Platform party's Barbara Borys-Damięcka with almost 197 thousand. She regularly engaged in activities supporting the Law and Justice Party, and was one of the main speakers on behalf of the organizers of the "March of Freedom and Justice" on 13 December 2015.

Personal life 
After her third year of studies, she married Ignacy Gogolewski, with whom she had a daughter, Agnieszka. The marriage broke up after ten years. From 1984 until his death in 2018, her second husband was Andrzej Błaszczak.

Awards 
 1966 – Cross of Merit (Poland)
 1966 – Nagroda CRZZ
 1967 – Badge of the 1000th anniversary of the Polish State
 1970 – Badge for her services for Warsaw
 1970 – Order of Polonia Restituta
 1975 – Medal of Merit for National Defence
 1975 – Badge of Merit by the FJN
 1998 – Order of Polonia Restituta
 1999 – Cultural Activist of Merit for publishing the second circulation during the period of martial law* 2006 – Medal for Merit to Culture – Gloria Artis
 2007 – Order of Polonia Restituta (for "outstanding achievements in business for democratic transformation in Poland, for her involvement in the struggle for freedom of expression and free media, for achievements undertaken for the benefit of the country and social work").

Theatres 
 Polish Theatre in Warsaw – 1955–59 and 1983–95
 Drama Theatre in Warsaw – 1959–62 and 1966–77
 National Theatre, Warsaw in Warszawie – 1962–66
 Ateneum Theatre – 1977–83

Filmography

Bibliography 
 Nota biograficzna w Encyklopedii Solidarności

External links 
 Katarzyna Łaniewska-Błaszczak at filmweb.pl
 Katarzyna Łaniewska-Błaszczak at  filmpolski.pl
 Katarzyna Łaniewska-Błaszczak at e-teatr.pl
 Katarzyna Łaniewska-Błaszczak at stopklatka.pl
 Katarzyna Łaniewska na zdjęciach at Filmoteki Narodowej "Fototeka"

Polish United Workers' Party members
Polish dissidents
Recipients of the Gold Medal for Merit to Culture – Gloria Artis
Polish stage actresses
1933 births
2020 deaths
Polish actresses
Polish Roman Catholics
People from Łódź
People from Łódź Voivodeship (1919–1939)
20th-century Polish women
Recipient of the Meritorious Activist of Culture badge